Wilmington Branch is a branch library of the Los Angeles Public Library located in the Wilmington section of Los Angeles, California.  It was built in 1927 based on a Spanish Colonial Revival design by architect W.E. McAllister.

In 1987, the Wilmington Branch and several other branch libraries in Los Angeles were added to the National Register of Historic Places as part of a thematic group submission.   The application noted that the branch libraries had been constructed in a variety of period revival styles to house the initial branch library system of the City of Los Angeles.

A new building, on Avalon Boulevard and M Street, was constructed in 1988 and is the current home of the Wilmington Branch Library.

See also
List of Registered Historic Places in Los Angeles
List of Los Angeles Historic-Cultural Monuments in the Harbor area
Los Angeles Public Library

References

External links
 Wilmington Branch Library (current building) - Los Angeles Public Library

Library buildings completed in 1927
Libraries in Los Angeles
Libraries on the National Register of Historic Places in Los Angeles
Spanish Colonial Revival architecture in California
Wilmington, Los Angeles